Trnovlje pri Socki is a settlement in the hills east of Socka in the Municipality of Vojnik in eastern Slovenia. The area is part of the traditional region of Styria. It is now included with the rest of the municipality in the Savinja Statistical Region.

Name
The name of the settlement was changed from Trnovlje to Trnovlje pri Socki in 1953.

References

External links
Trnovlje pri Socki at Geopedia

Populated places in the Municipality of Vojnik